Uruguay is a station on Line B of the Buenos Aires Underground. It is located at the intersection of Avenida Corrientes and Calle Uruguay, near to the Courthouse and in the middle of the city's main theatre district. The station was opened on 22 July 1931 as part of the extension of the line from Callao to Carlos Pellegrini.

Gallery

References

External links

Buenos Aires Underground stations
Railway stations opened in 1931
1931 establishments in Argentina